Amit Sarin is an Indian television actor.  His first role was on Kkusum, followed by roles in Kyunki Saas Bhi Kabhi Bahu Thi, Risshton Ki Dor and Doli Saja Ke, Humse Hai Liife .

Personal life
He was born in Varanasi, Uttar Pradesh, India.

Career
Sarin has appeared in several Indian television series.  From 2003 until 2005 he appeared in Kkusum.  From 2004 until 2006 he was in Kyunki Saas Bhi Kabhi Bahu Thi, 2006 through 2007 in Risshton Ki Dor and in 2007 he was in Doli Saja Ke.  In 2020, he was working on the film Between Mountains.

Filmography

Television

References

External links
 

Year of birth missing (living people)
Living people
Indian television actors
Male actors from Varanasi